is a Japanese judoka.

He won a medal at the 2019 World Judo Championships.

He won the gold medal in his event at the 2022 Judo Grand Slam Paris held in Paris, France.

References

External links
 
 
 

2000 births
Living people
Japanese male judoka
World judo champions
21st-century Japanese people